Lookout Low is the fourth studio album by American garage rock band Twin Peaks, released on September 13, 2019 on Grand Jury Music in North America, Inertia and Space 44 in Australia and New Zealand and the rest of the world on Communion.

Background 
On July 17, 2019, Twin Peaks announced the release of Lookout Low, as well as premiered the first single "Dance Through It", after teasing it on social media. "Ferry Song" was released as the second single on August 20, 2019, and "Oh Mama" was released as the third single on September 10, 2019.

Outtakes 

 "Our World" was released as the b-side to "Dance Through It," then digitally released on October 31, 2019.

Track listing

Personnel 
Credits adapted from Lookout Low liner notes.

Twin Peaks

 Connor Brodner – drums 
 Colin Croom – lead vocals , guitars , piano , Mellotron , Moog Grandmother , Wurlitzer , pump organ , synthesizer , horn arrangements 
 Jack Dolan – bass guitar , lead vocals 
 Clay Frankel – lead vocals , guitars , "drone" 
 Cadien Lake James – lead vocals , guitars , "drone" 

Additional musicians

 Gary Alesbrook – trumpet 
Sima Cunningham – vocals 
 Kyle Davis – percussion , Mellotron 
 Ethan Johns – Moog Grandmother , mandolin 
 Macie Stewart – vocals 
 Tom Taylor – saxophone 

Production

Matt Colton – mastering
 Ethan Johns – producer, mixer
 Callum Marinho – assistant engineer
 Dominic Monks –  engineer
 Ned Roberts – assistant engineer

Artwork

 Connor Brodner – photography
 Clay Frankel – cover & design
 Cadien Lake James – cover & design

Charts

References 

2019 albums
Twin Peaks (band) albums